Francis Agu (18 February 1965 – 20 March 2007) was a Nigerian TV and cinema ("Nollywood") actor. He was best known for his role on the long-running Nigerian television series Checkmate.

Early life 

Francis Okechukwu Agu was born in Lagos on 18 February 1965 to the Catholic family of Fidelis and Virginia Agu from Enugu-Ngwo, Enugu state, and was the seventh of eight children. His name, Okechukwu, means "God's portion". A quiet and intelligent youth, he was at one time a member of the Altar Boys and a Lector at St. Dominic's Catholic Church, Yaba, Lagos. He started his formal education at Ladi-Lak Institute Alagomeji, Ebute-Metta, Lagos. His high school education was obtained at St. Finbarr's College, Lagos, where he was groomed by the missionary founder of the school, Rev. Fr. Dennis Joseph Slattery. He also attended the University of Lagos, where he studied Mass Communication.

Career 

Agu's theatrical career began at the Yodrac Playhouse at St. Dominic's Church, at which time he was already working for  Nigeria Arab Bank in Lagos. Yodrac, founded by George Eboka, has produced entertainment industry professionals such as Toyin Oshinaike, Kevin Ushi, Kris Ubani-Roberts, Williams Ekpo, Gregory Odutayo, Jude Orhorha, Tunji Otun, and Neye Adebulugbe.
Agu's talent was immediately spotted by the then director of Yodrac, Isaac John.

His first appearance was in the play This is Our Chance by James Ene Henshaw, directed by Isaac John. He played the lead role, King Damba. Others include The Gods Are Not to Blame by Ola Rotimi, and Trials of Brother Jero by Wole Soyinka.

Segun Ojewuyi directed him in an ironical play The Man Who Never Died at the National Theater, Lagos. This was followed by several productions with different theater gurus such as Chuck Mike. He also had a stint in singing with the Steve Rhodes Voices, directed by Elder Steve Rhodes himself.

Agu featured in Checkmate, a 1990s TV soap opera, in which he played the character Benny. He also starred as Ichie Million in the first Nigerian Home Video, Living in Bondage, which brought him to national fame. He produced his first film Jezebel in 1994 and went on to produce and direct many others, including In the Name of the Father, A Divine Call, The Boy is Mine, Body and Soul, Love and Pride, A Dance in the Forest, and Take Me to Jesus.

Agu became ill in October 2006, and died on 20 March 2007.

Filmography 
Living in Bondage (1992)
Bloodbrothers
Bloodbrothers 2
A Minute to Midnite
Untouchable
Circle of Doom (1993)
Jesus
Blood Money (1997)

References 

Vanguard, newspaper website 
Sun News, Archive of newspaper article
The National, Archive of newspaper website

External links 
Archive of Francis Agu Memorial website

1965 births
2007 deaths
Igbo male actors
Nigerian male film actors
Male actors from Lagos
University of Lagos alumni
20th-century Nigerian male actors
Nigerian male stage actors
21st-century Nigerian male actors
Nigerian male television actors
Male actors from Enugu State
Nigerian film directors
Nigerian film producers
Actors from Enugu State
People from Enugu State